Heroes of Land, Air & Sea is a 2018 fantasy-themed 4X area control board game published by Gamelyn Games and designed by Scott Almes.

References

External links 

 

Board games introduced in 2018
4X games
Fantasy board games